Aaron Allan Edson  (1846–1888) was a Canadian landscape painter from Québec.

Biography 
At the age of nine, his family settled in Stanbridge, where his father ran a hotel. Nearby was a bank owned by John Carpenter Baker, a patron of the arts who helped start the careers of Edson and another local painter, Wyatt Eaton, by helping to pay for art lessons and buying their works. In addition to his art studies, Edson received a standard commercial education.

In 1861 he moved to Montréal, where he worked as the bookkeeper for a frame maker and art dealer named Augustus Pell, who introduced him to local artists. Around 1863, he took lessons from Robert Scott Duncanson, an American painter who lived there during the Civil War. This was followed by two years in London, England for further studies. Upon his return, he became a founding members of the Society of Canadian Artists in 1867, the earliest Canadian professional body of artists, and participated in their first exhibition in 1868. He was also one of the original members of the Ontario Society of Artists, founded in 1872, and the Royal Canadian Academy of Arts, established in 1880 with Royal patronage. At one of their first exhibitions, some of his works were purchased by Princess Louise for herself and her mother, Queen Victoria.

He exhibited regularly throughout Canada. He also presented his works at the Royal Academy of Arts in London, the Paris Salon and two world's fairs; the Centennial Exposition in Philadelphia and the Exposition Universelle in Antwerp.

In the early 1880s, he went to live in France, spending most of his time in Cernay-la-Ville, where he studied with Léon Germain Pelouse. From 1886 to 1887, he was in London, then returned to Canada, settling in Sutton, Québec. The following year, he died of complications from pneumonia, which he caught while on an expedition to paint winter scenes.

Selected paintings

References

Further reading 
 Diana Dutton, Aaron Allan Edson (1846-1888), Musée Marcil de Saint-Lambert (1985) 
 Gordon H. Day, The life and times of Aaron Allan Edson, A thesis in the department of fine arts, Concordia University (1977) Online

External links

Arcadja Auctions: More works by Edson

1846 births
1888 deaths
Canadian landscape painters
Artists from Quebec
People from Estrie
Anglophone Quebec people
19th-century Canadian painters
Canadian male painters
19th-century Canadian male artists
Members of the Royal Canadian Academy of Arts